There is no formal championship award given to the jockey who won the most races in United States Thoroughbred racing. However, it is a prestigious accomplishment always on any jockey's résumé and widely reported on by the various media.

Milestones
 In 1952, Anthony DeSpirito won 390 races, breaking Walter Miller's forty-six-year-old record of 388.
 On December 15, 1973 Sandy Hawley became the first jockey in history to win 500 races in a single year.
 In 1989, Kent Desormeaux set the current record for wins in a single calendar year with 598. 
 With ten championships, Russell Baze has won the title more than any other jockey.

 *Often recorded misspelled as "Ranch"

See also 
 United States Champion Jockey by earnings

References

 January 8, 1934 TIME magazine article on the leading race-winning jockey of 1933
 December 31, 1933 New York Times article on the leading race-winning jockey of 1933

American jockeys
American Champion jockeys
Horse racing in the United States